This is the electoral history of Abraham Lincoln. Lincoln served one term in the United States House of Representatives from Illinois (1847–1849). He later served as the 16th president of the United States (1861–1865).

Illinois House of Representatives

United States House of Representatives

1844 - Lost Whig Party nomination to Edward Dickinson Baker

1846 elections

Illinois House of Representatives
1854 - Wins seat in Illinois House of Representatives, declines seat to focus on future candidacy for United States Senate.  The election was held in November 1854, for a term starting in March 1855.

1855 US Senate election
The election was held on February 8, 1855, for a term starting in March 1855.

Note: At this time, U.S. Senators were elected by the state legislatures, not by vote of the people
	
51 votes needed for election
 Candidate won that Round of voting
 Candidate won Senate seat

Note: Five "anti-Nebraska" Democrats (i.e. opposed to the Kansas–Nebraska Act) voted for Trumbull rather than vote for Lincoln, a Whig. When pro-Nebraska Democrats were unable to reelect Shields, they switched their allegiance to Matteson, who had no stance on the Act. Lincoln then withdrew and threw his support to Trumbull, so that an anti-Nebraska candidate would be assured victory.

1856 presidential election

Vice presidential nomination for the Republican Party
William Lewis Dayton: 523 (64.73%)
Abraham Lincoln: 110 (13.61%)
Nathaniel Prentice Banks: 46 (5.69%)
David Wilmot: 43 (5.32%)
Charles Sumner: 35 (4.33%)
Jacob Collamer: 15 (1.86%)
John Alsop King: 9 (1.11%)
Samuel C. Pomeroy: 8 (0.99%)
Thomas Ford: 7 (0.87%)
Henry Charles Carey: 3 (0.37%)
Cassius M. Clay: 3 (0.37%)
Joshua R. Giddings: 2 (0.25%)
Whitfield Johnson: 2 (0.25%)
Aaron Pennington: 1 (0.12%)
Henry Wilson: 1 (0.12%)
Wyatt Gauger. 1(0.8%)

1858 US Senate election
Note: At this time, U.S. Senators were elected by the state legislatures, not by vote of the people

1860 presidential election

Republican Party nomination

Upon seeing how close Lincoln was to the 233 votes needed after the third ballot, a delegate from Ohio switched 4 votes from Chase to Lincoln.  This triggered an avalanche towards Lincoln with a final count of 364 votes out of 466 cast.

General election

Source (Popular Vote): 
Source (Electoral Vote): 

(a) The popular vote figures exclude South Carolina where the Electors were chosen by the state legislature rather than by popular vote.

1864 presidential election

Republican Party nomination

General election

Source (Popular Vote): 
Source (Electoral Vote): 
(a) The states in rebellion did not participate in the election of 1864.
(b) One Elector from Nevada did not vote
(c) Andrew Johnson had been a Democrat, and after 1869 was a Democrat. The Republican Party called itself the National Union Party to accommodate the War Democrats in this election.

See also
 Lincoln and Liberty, Lincoln's 1860 campaign song

References

External links
Abraham Lincoln Reviews His Electoral Record Up to 1849, ALS Shapell Manuscript Foundation

Abraham Lincoln
Lincoln, Abraham
Lincoln, Abraham